Steffany Dawn Gretzinger (née Frizzell) is a Christian music singer-songwriter and former ensemble vocalist with Bethel Music, based in Redding, California. She released her first solo album, The Undoing, with Bethel Music in 2014. The album was a Billboard magazine breakthrough release, reaching number twenty on the Billboard 200, and also gained top five status among Top Christian and Independent albums in September 2014.

Career

Featuring
Steffany Gretzinger worked mainly as a worship leader with Bethel Music, which is a part of Bethel Church in Redding, California. She was involved in three of Bethel Music's releases, which included: background vocals for Be Lifted High (2011, as Steffany Frizzell), "One Thirst" with fellow Bethel collective member Jeremy Riddle, and background vocals on fellow Bethel Music member William Matthews' release, Hope's Anthem (2011, as Steffany Frizzell).

Another release from such a gathering was The Loft Sessions (2012, again as Steffany Frizzell), where she was a featured vocalist and composer (and performed background vocals). The Loft Sessions was a live recording made "over several nights of worship sessions" in a rustic, refurbished loft, on which she sang "You Know Me" (solo) and "My Dear" (with Hunter Thompson). That same year, she was featured on the album For the Sake of the World, singing "Closer". She joined Bethel again for their release of Tides (2013), also released internationally (e.g., on the Onimusic label in Brazil), with her songs "Letting Go" and "Be Still".

Solo
Gretzinger's first solo album, The Undoing (2014), featured eleven original praise and worship pieces, accompanied by guitar and piano, and was released in August by Bethel Music. The album was a Billboard magazine breakthrough release and appeared on the Top Christian Albums chart at No. 2, the Independent Albums chart at No. 5, and the Billboard 200 chart at No. 20.

Since recording The Undoing, Gretzinger was featured on two further Bethel Music albums: You Make Me Brave (2014, "We Dance") and Have It All (2016, "Pieces"), the latter of which was also featured on Bethel member Amanda Cook's release, Brave New World (2015).

On March 9, 2018, Bethel Music announced the release of Gretzinger's second full-length studio project, Blackout, releasing the lead single, "Save Me". The album was released on March 29, 2018. She was featured on Francesca Battistelli's 2019 song "Defender", which Gretzinger co-wrote.

In 2020, Gretzinger released her third album, Forever Amen, with Provident Music Group.

Biography

Steffany Dawn (née Frizzell) Gretzinger has been engaged in worship ministry since childhood and grew up in a musical household.  She moved to Redding, California, in 2008, to join the Bethel School of Supernatural Ministry.  She was a worship leader at Bethel Church.  She led her final worship service at Bethel Church on April 21, 2019, prior to relocating to Nashville, Tennessee.

Gretzinger is married to Stephen Gretzinger, and they have two children.

Gretzinger's mother, Kathy Frizzell, is involved in the Christian music industry in Nashville, Tennessee, as a writer. She is currently a worship leader at Wooster Church of the Nazarene in Wooster, Ohio. Gretzinger's late father, Ron Frizzell, was one of the associate pastors on staff at Wooster Nazarene.

Discography

Albums

Singles

As lead artist

As featured artist

Other charted songs

Other appearances

Awards and nominations

GMA Dove Awards

!
|-
| 2018
| Blackout
| Short Form Video of the Year
| 
| 
|-
| 2020
| Forever Amen
| Recorded Music Packaging of the Year
| 
| 
|-
| rowspan="2" | 2021
| "Good & Loved" 
| rowspan="2" | Gospel Worship Recorded Song of the Year
| 
| rowspan="2" | 
|-
| "Voice of God" 
| 
|}

Grammy Awards 

!
|-
| 2022
| "Voice of God" 
| Best Gospel Performance/Song
| 
| 
|}

See also

 Bill Johnson (pastor)

References

Further reading

External links
 Bethel Music website
 Watershed Music website
 Wedding video at Vimeo

1984 births
Living people
American performers of Christian music
Musicians from California
Songwriters from California
People from Redding, California
21st-century American women musicians
21st-century American musicians